Lars Veldwijk (born 21 August 1991) is a professional soccer player who plays as a striker for Suwon FC in the South Korean K League 1. Born in the Netherlands, he represents the South Africa national team.

Club career

Excelsior
Veldwijk represented Eerste Divisie side Excelsior in the 2013–14 season, and scored 35 goals in 45 appearances across all competitions.

Nottingham Forest
On 12 June 2014, Veldwijk signed for Nottingham Forest from Excelsior for a fee of £500,000 that could rise to £1 million depending on various clauses. He made his debut on 16 August 2014 against Bolton Wanderers at the Macron Stadium as a 92nd-minute substitute for fellow striker Matty Fryatt. Veldwijk made his first start for Forest on 26 August 2014 in a 2–0 win against Huddersfield Town in the second round of the League Cup. Veldwijk went on loan to PEC Zwolle for the 2015–16 season, during which time he scored 14 goals in 33 league appearances. Upon his return to Forest he scored his first and only goal for the club in a 2–1 EFL Cup win against Millwall on 23 August 2016.

Loan to Aalesund
On 31 March 2017, Veldwijk signed for the Norwegian football club Aalesunds FK on loan, with an option to buy when the loan period is over.

Jeonbuk Hyundai Motors
On 15 January 2020, having previously been in negotiations with an unnamed club in South Africa,as well as Eredivisie sides also showing interest in him. Veldwijk signed for South Korea's reigning K League 1 champions Jeonbuk Hyundai Motors. He made his official debut for the club in March, during a 2–2 AFC Champions League draw against Sydney FC, but had to wait until May to feature in the league for the first time after football was suspended in South Korea due to the COVID-19 pandemic. After recovering from a minor knee injury, he marked his K League 1 league debut with a 93rd-minute winner against Busan IPark, before making his first start two weeks later.

Suwon FC
On 17 July 2020, Veldwijk dropped down a division to join K League 2 side Suwon FC on a permanent deal. He signed with Suwon FC for a contract that runs out until 31 December 2022.

During the 2021 K League 1 he managed to score 18 goals in 32 appearances and having 6 assists.

International career
Although born in the Netherlands, and having spent his formative years progressive through the Dutch youth system at club level, Veldwijk was eligible to represent South Africa through his paternal lineage. He received his maiden call for the nation's 2018 World Cup qualifier against Senegal in October 2016 before debuting in a 1–1 friendly tie with Mozambique the following month. After a spell away from the team, he then returned to the national fold to feature in his first international tournament in 2019, making five substitute appearances as South Africa reached the quarter-finals of the 2019 Africa Cup of Nations.

Career statistics

Club

International

Honours
Individual
Eerste Divisie top scorer: 2013–14

K League 1 Best XI: 2021

References

External links
 Lars Veldwijk Interview
 

1991 births
Living people
People from Uithoorn
Association football forwards
South African soccer players
South Africa international soccer players
Dutch footballers
South African people of Dutch descent
Dutch people of South African descent
SV Argon players
FC Groningen players
FC Volendam players
FC Utrecht players
FC Dordrecht players
Excelsior Rotterdam players
Nottingham Forest F.C. players
PEC Zwolle players
K.V. Kortrijk players
Sparta Rotterdam players
Jeonbuk Hyundai Motors players
Suwon FC players
Eredivisie players
Eerste Divisie players
Eliteserien players
K League 1 players
K League 2 players
White South African people
South African expatriate soccer players
South African expatriate sportspeople in England
South African expatriate sportspeople in Belgium
South African expatriate sportspeople in Norway
Expatriate footballers in England
Expatriate footballers in Belgium
Expatriate footballers in Norway
2019 Africa Cup of Nations players
Footballers from North Holland